is one of four wards of Okayama, Okayama Prefecture, Japan. The ward has an area of 451.03 km² and a population of 295,312. The population density is 655 per square kilometer. The name means "North Ward."

The wards of Okayama were established when Okayama became a city designated by government ordinance on April 1, 2009.

The city has its municipal headquarters in kita-ku.

The South Korean government maintains the Korea Education Institution in Kita-ku.

Geography

Climate
Kurashiki has a humid subtropical climate (Köppen climate classification Cfa).

References

External links

岡山市北区役所 (Ward office official home page)

Wards of Okayama